National Highway 115 is a national highway of India. It starts from Dum Duma and terminates at Roing in the Indian state of Assam.

References

National Highways in Rajasthan
National highways in India